Rachel Jessica Te Ao Maarama House  (born 20 October 1971) is a New Zealand actress, comedian, director and acting coach. She is best known for her starring in the films Whale Rider (2002), Boy (2010), White Lies (2013), Hunt for the Wilderpeople (2016), Moana (2016), and Soul (2020). She is currently a series regular on the 2022 reboot of Heartbreak High in the role of  Principal Stacy "Woodsy" Woods and recurring in the New Zealand Dark comedy-drama Creamerie in the role of Doc Harvey. House is also a regular fixture of New Zealand theatre.

Early life 
House was born in 1971 in Auckland and was raised in Kamo, Whangarei, by her adoptive Scottish parents John and Sheila House. She is of Māori (Ngāti Mutunga and Ngāi Tahu) and European descent.

Career

Acting 
House attended the New Zealand national drama school, Toi Whakaari, graduating in 1992. From here she went into stage work with Pacific Underground Theatre and Auckland Theatre Company. In 1995, she won the Chapman Tripp Theatre Award Most Promising Female Newcomer of the Year Award for her performance in the one-woman show Nga Pou Wahine by Briar Grace-Smith. This was followed by other awards in 2000 (Most Outstanding Performance) for Witi Ihimaera's critically acclaimed Woman Far Walking (in which she played the key role of Tiriti, a 160-year-old woman) and 2003 (Best Supporting Actress) in Henrik Ibsen's An Enemy of the People.

She has acted in several major productions that have toured both nationally and internationally, including Hone Kouka's Waiora, Carol Anne Duffy's The Worlds Wife and the UK/New Zealand co-production of Beauty and the Beast.

House's film work has included roles in Whale Rider, Eagle vs Shark, Boy, and White Lies. Her television appearances include Maddigan's Quest and Gaylene Preston's series Hope and Wire. Jason Buchanan of the Rovi corporation says of her "While she may not necessarily possess traditional Hollywood good looks, House has an undeniably distinct persona onscreen and exhibits just the kind of charisma that could prove the foundation for an enduring career."

In 2016, House appeared in Taika Waititi's feature film Hunt for the Wilderpeople. The film became the top grossing New Zealand film of all time at the New Zealand box office.

House voiced the character of Gramma Tala in the 2016 Disney animated film Moana. In 2017, she played Grandmaster's bodyguard Topaz in Thor: Ragnarok.   In 2020, she provided the voice of Terry in the Pixar animated film Soul.

House is a frequent collaborator of director Taika Waititi, acting in four of his films (Eagle vs Shark, Boy,  Hunt for the Wilderpeople, Thor: Ragnarok) while also serving as acting coach for the young actors on Boy, Hunt for the Wilderpeople and Jojo Rabbit.  She also worked as acting coach in Everything We Loved, The Dark Horse, The Rehearsal and the second season of the series Top of the Lake.

Directing 
House has directed several theatrical performances, winning the 2001 Director of the Year award at both the Chapman Tripp Theatre Awards and the New Zealand Listener Awards for her direction of Mitch Tawhi Thomas' play Have Car Will Travel.

House attended the Prague Film School in 2008 and was awarded Best Director and Best Film Audience Award for her two short films made while studying there. In 2010, House directed Kylie Meehan's short film The Winter Boy, produced by Hineani Melbourne for the New Zealand Film Commission's  Premiere Shorts.

In 2012, House directed the Māori-language version of Shakespeare's Troilus and Cressida, Toroihi rāua ko Kahira, adapted by Te Haumihiata Mason and set in a classical Māori and a pre-colonial Māori world. It was performed as part of an international series at London's Globe Theatre. For this she was awarded Production of the Year and Director of the Year at the Chapman Tripp Theatre Awards. Other theatre directing work includes the award-winning production of Hinepau, which House also co-adapted from Gavin Bishop's original book and toured both nationally and internationally, Neil La Bute's The Mercy Seat and Hui by longtime collaborator Mitch Tawhi Thomas that premiered at the Auckland Arts Festival in 2013.

In 2016, House directed Auckland based theatre company Silo Theatre's production of Medea, a contemporary retelling of the Euripides myth created by Australian theatre-makers Kate Mulvany and Anne-Louise Sarks.

Achievements 
In 2012, House received the New Zealand Arts Foundation's Laureate Award, which is given as an investment in excellence across a range of art forms for an artist with prominence and outstanding potential for future growth. In 2016, House received the WIFT (Women in Film & Television) NZ Mana Wāhine Award for her prolific contribution to theatre and film, both in front of and behind the camera.

In the 2017 Queen's Birthday Honours, House was appointed an Officer of the New Zealand Order of Merit for services to the performing arts.

Filmography

Film

Television

Theatre

Actor

Director

Awards

References

External links 
 
 "Rachel House", The Arts Foundation. Retrieved 22 June 2013.

1971 births
Living people
20th-century New Zealand actresses
21st-century New Zealand actresses
New Zealand adoptees
New Zealand film actresses
New Zealand television actresses
New Zealand Māori actresses
Officers of the New Zealand Order of Merit
New Zealand people of Scottish descent
People from the Northland Region
Ngāi Tahu people
Ngāti Mutunga people
People from Auckland
Toi Whakaari alumni